Mount Black Prince is a  mountain summit located in Peter Lougheed Provincial Park in the Canadian Rockies of Alberta, Canada. Its nearest higher peak is Mount Smith Dorrien,  to the northwest. The mountain can be seen from highway 742, also known as Smith-Dorrien/Spray Trail.

Like so many of the mountains in Kananaskis Country, Mount Black Prince received its name from the persons and ships involved in the 1916 Battle of Jutland, the only major sea battle of the First World War.

History

The mountain's name was made official in 1922 by the Geographical Names Board of Canada.

The first ascent of the peak was made in 1956 by B. Fraser, M. Hicks, and J. Gorril.

Geology

Mount Black Prince is composed of sedimentary rock laid down during the Precambrian to Jurassic periods. Formed in shallow seas, this sedimentary rock was pushed east and over the top of younger rock during the Laramide orogeny.

Climate

Based on the Köppen climate classification, Mount Black Prince is located in a subarctic climate with cold, snowy winters, and mild summers. Temperatures can drop below  with wind chill factors below . In terms of favorable weather, July through September are the best months to climb. Precipitation runoff from the mountain drains into tributaries of the Kananaskis River, thence into the Bow River.

References

See also
 List of mountains in the Canadian Rockies
 Geography of Alberta
 Black Prince Mountain

Two-thousanders of Alberta
Alberta's Rockies